Olando is a Kenyan surname. Notable people with the surname include:

 Crispin Olando (born 1988), Kenyan international footballer
 Philadelphia Olando (born 1990), Kenyan rugby sevens player

See also
 Orlando (disambiguation)

Surnames of Kenyan origin